Shree Jagganath Pahadia govt. medical college also known as Govt medical college Bharatpur is a full-fledged tertiary Medical college in Bharatpur, Rajasthan. It was established in the year 2017. The college imparts the degree of Bachelor of Medicine and Surgery (MBBS) and at post graduation level Dnb in paediatrics gyne ophthalmology ENT...etc. Nursing and para-medical courses are also offered. The college is affiliated with Rajasthan University of Health Sciences and is recognized by Medical Council of India. The selection to the college is done on the basis of merit through National Eligibility and Entrance Test. The college started MBBS courses in August 2018. The attached hospitals are Raj Bahadur memorial hospital with speciality and super speciality services along with a pediatric hospital janana hospital and Ram katori eye hospital. The college is well recognized by NMC and has been awarded excellence in doing fieldwork in the Bharatpur region.
Bharatpur region includes Bharatpur karauli Dholpur and Sawai Madhopur.
RBM hospital is the biggest referral hospital in the region.

Courses
Bharatpur Medical College undertakes the education and training of students in MBBS courses.

References

External links 
 https://education.rajasthan.gov.in/content/raj/education/bharatpur-medical-college--bharatpur/en/home.html#

2018 establishments in Rajasthan
Affiliates of Rajasthan University of Health Sciences
Educational institutions established in 2018
Medical colleges in Rajasthan